The Central District of Arsanjan County is a district (bakhsh) in Arsanjan County, Fars Province, Iran. At the 2006 census, its population was 40,916, in 9,800 families.  The District has one city: Arsanjan. The District has three rural districts (dehestan): Aliabad-e Malek Rural District, Khobriz Rural District, and Shurab Rural District.

References 

Arsanjan County
Districts of Fars Province